Jack Chang may refer to:
Chang Liyi (1929–2019), Republic of China Air Force pilot
Chang Chen-kuang (born 1956), Taiwanese actor